Hedbergia decurva, formerly Bartsia decurva, is a species of flowering plants in the family Orobanchaceae.

It is an afromontane species, restricted to the mountains of northeastern Africa.

Phylogeny 
The phylogeny of the genera of Rhinantheae has been explored using molecular characters. Hedbergia decurva groups with Hedbergia longiflora and Hedbergia abyssinica into a Hedbergia clade nested within the core Rhinantheae. These three taxa share evolutionary affinities with genera Tozzia, Bellardia, Neobartsia, Parentucellia, and Odontites.

References 

decurva
Species described in 1846